WAMI-FM (102.3 FM, "Classic Country 102.3") is a commercial radio station licensed to serve the community of Opp, Alabama, United States. The station is owned by Covington Media LLC.

Programming
WAMI-FM broadcasts a classic country music format and features select programming from Citadel Media.

References

External links

AMI-FM
Classic country radio stations in the United States
Covington County, Alabama
Radio stations established in 1974
1974 establishments in Alabama